Hojapil Sanctuary is a sanctuary (zakaznik) of Turkmenistan and a part of Köýtendag Nature Reserve. It was established in 1986.

Sites

Dinosaur Plateau 
An inclined limestone slab—spanning about 0.5 km in length and  0.2 km in width—preserving hundreds of dinosaur footprints, is a popular tourist attraction. The site was discovered by Soviet geologist in the 80s; Turkmen scientists propose the evidence to be suggestive of three new dinosaur species: Gissarosaurus, Hojapilosaurus, and Turkmenosaurus. In local tradition, the footprints were cast by elephants belonging either to the forces of Alexander the Great or some returning pilgrim from India.

Kyrk Gyz Cave 
A sacred site in Turkmen tradition, the floor of the cave has a tomb. Local legends explain the cave to have been created in an act of God, when 40 women — fearing capture by rogues — prayed for protection.

Umbardepe Canyon 
A waterfal l— having a height of 27 m. — is popular among tourists.

References 

Sanctuaries in Turkmenistan